Raydell Kewal (born 24 December 1985 in Amsterdam) is a Dutch footballer who played for Eerste Divisie club Stormvogels Telstar during the 2007-2008 football season.

References

External links
 voetbal international profile

Dutch footballers
Footballers from Amsterdam
SC Telstar players
Eerste Divisie players
1985 births
Living people
Association footballers not categorized by position